The Kingdom of Paramithi is an Australian children's television series first screened on the Nine Network and Nick Jr. on 11 November 2008. The series is created by The Wiggles and Nickelodeon, with 30 half-hour episodes for pre-school children.

The Kingdom of Paramithi is a fairy tale series with stories, songs and dance. Paramithi is a Greek word for fairytale. The series has been created by Anthony Field and Paul Field, written by Paul Field and Paul Paddick and developed with the experience of The Wiggles production team.

The program is also broadcast on the ATV World channel of Hong Kong.

Characters
 King John (Simon Pryce)
 Queen Isabella (Carolyn Ferrie)
 James (John Rowe)
 Genevieve (Kendall Goddard)
 Anastasia (Cassie Howarth)
 Johnny (John Martin)
 Mario (Paul Paddick)
 Bobby (Brad Carroll)
 Bernadette (Fiona Sullivan)
 Sarah (Jennifer Andrade)
 Carlos (Fernando Jorge Moguel)

Episodes

Home Media Releases
The Kingdom of Paramithi was released on DVD in 2009. Other DVDs released include All Time Favourite Fairytales, Tales of Enchantment and Cinderella Pantomime.

References

Australian children's television series
Nine Network original programming
Television shows set in Adelaide
2008 Australian television series debuts
Musical television series
English-language television shows